Moribund is the second album by Norwegian black metal band Koldbrann released in 2006. It features guest appearances by Iblis and L. Wachtfels from Endstille.

Track listing
"Alt er Befengt" (All is Infected) – 6:01	
"I Suveren Forakt" (In Sovereign Contempt) – 6:39
"Steinet til Jorden" (Stoned to the Ground) – 5:58
"Djevelens Treskeverk" (The Devil's Tresher) – 6:01
"Smell of Vitriol" – 5:44
"Moribund" – 5:37
"Av Sjel Stagnert" (Of Stagnated Soul) – 6:40
"Til Skiringsheim" – 2:14
"Fullt Spekter Dominans" (Full Spectre Dominance) – 4:14
"Skvadron" (Squadron) – 6:43
"Bestial Swarm" – 3:56

Credits
Mannevond – guitar, vocals
Kvass – guitar
Fordervelse – drums
S. Johnskareng – bass guitar
G. Antonsen – guitar
Iblis – additional vocals on "Bestial Swarm"
L. Wachtfels – introduction on "Djevelens Treskeverk"

References

2006 albums
Koldbrann albums